"Hold You Down" is a song by American rock band X Ambassadors. It was released as the third single from their second studio album, Orion, on May 31, 2019.

Composition and lyrical interpretation 
According to TuneBat.com, Hold You Down is written in the key of D♭ minor and has a tempo of 79 beats per minute.

The song is described by frontman Sam Harris as "a song about devotion. Saying to that one person... 'no matter what happens, I will always be there for you.'"

Music video
The music video was released on the same day as the song. The video features home footage of Sam Harris and keyboardist Casey Harris growing up as brothers in Ithaca, New York.

References

2019 singles
2019 songs
X Ambassadors songs
Songs written by Ricky Reed
Songs written by Jacob Kasher
Songs written by Malay (record producer)
Kidinakorner singles
Interscope Records singles